The 1957 Chicago White Sox season was the team's 57th season in the major leagues, and its 58th season overall. They finished with a record of 90–64, good enough for second place in the American League, 8 games behind the first-place New York Yankees.

Offseason 
 Prior to 1957 season: Stan Johnson was signed as an amateur free agent by the White Sox.

Regular season 
 April 16, 1957: Roger Maris made his major league debut for the Cleveland Indians against the White Sox. In 5 at bats, Maris had 3 hits.

Season standings

Record vs. opponents

Opening Day lineup 
 Luis Aparicio, SS
 Nellie Fox, 2B
 Minnie Miñoso, LF
 Sherm Lollar, C
 Larry Doby, CF
 Jim Landis, RF
 Jim Rivera, 1B
 Bubba Phillips, 3B
 Billy Pierce, P

Notable transactions 
 June 14, 1957: Johnny Callison was signed as an amateur free agent by the White Sox.
 June 14, 1957: Dave Philley was traded by the White Sox to the Detroit Tigers for Earl Torgeson.

Roster

Player stats

Batting 
Note: G = Games played; AB = At bats; R = Runs scored; H = Hits; 2B = Doubles; 3B = Triples; HR = Home runs; RBI = Runs batted in; BB = Base on balls; SO = Strikeouts; AVG = Batting average; SB = Stolen bases

Pitching 
Note: W = Wins; L = Losses; ERA = Earned run average; G = Games pitched; GS = Games started; SV = Saves; IP = Innings pitched; H = Hits allowed; R = Runs allowed; ER = Earned runs allowed; HR = Home runs allowed; BB = Walks allowed; K = Strikeouts

Awards 

 Nellie Fox, Gold Glove Award
 Minnie Miñoso, Gold Glove Award
 Sherm Lollar, Gold Glove Award

Farm system

Notes

References 
 1957 Chicago White Sox at Baseball Reference

Chicago White Sox seasons
Chicago White Sox season
Chicago White